Tomaška Vas is a settlement in the City Municipality of Slovenj Gradec in northern Slovenia. The area is part of the traditional region of Styria. The entire municipality is now included in the Carinthia Statistical Region.

The local church from which the settlement gets its name is dedicated to Saint Thomas and belongs to the Parish of Šmartno pri Slovenj Gradcu. It was first mentioned in documents dating to 1375.

References

External links
Tomaška Vas at Geopedia

Populated places in the City Municipality of Slovenj Gradec
Slovenj Gradec